Adrienne Lois Kaeppler (July 26, 1935 – March 5, 2022) was an American anthropologist, curator of oceanic ethnology at the National Museum of Natural History at the  Smithsonian Institution in Washington, DC. She served as the President of the International Council on Traditional Music between 2005 and 2013. Her research focused on the interrelationships between social structure and the arts, including dance, music, and the visual arts, especially in Tonga and Hawaii. She was considered to be an expert on Tongan dance, and the voyages of the 18th-century explorer James Cook.

Career
Her research focused on material culture and the visual and performing arts in their cultural contexts, including traditional social and political structures and modern cultural identity.

Kaeppler attended the University of Wisconsin–Milwaukee, and received her Masters and PhD from the University of Hawaii. In the 1970s, she was an anthropologist at the Bishop Museum in Honolulu, Hawaii. She has taught anthropology, ethnomusicology, anthropology of dance, and art history at the University of Hawaii; the University of Maryland, College Park; the Queen's University in Belfast, Northern Ireland; Johns Hopkins University; and the University of California, Los Angeles.  She was also a member of the State Council on Hawaiian Heritage. In 1998, she worked in Tonga at the Tongan National Museum,  setting up a special exhibition on the 80th birthday of King Taufa'ahau Tupou IV. In 2004, she was vice-president of the International Council for Traditional Music, and she was elected as President in 2005, taking over from Krister Malm. She was a curator and anthropologist at the National Museum of Natural History of the Smithsonian Institution.

Personal life
Kaeppler was a majorette for her high school band, played violin in high school orchestra, and studied voice at the Wisconsin Conservatory of Music.

Kaeppler died on March 5, 2022, at the age of 86.

Awards
In 1978, Kaeppler was honored by the YWCA as a leading female scientist whose work increased the understanding of native cultures.

Kaeppler was also lauded for the book James Cook and the Exploration of the Pacific (published in 2009). The work was recognized with the 2010 First International Tribal Art Book Prize, organized by Tribal Art magazine in partnership with Sotheby's Paris Headquarters, and in April 2010, it was named Book of the Month by Hodern House in Australia.

In 2010, Kaeppler delivered a Smithsonian Secretary's Distinguished Research Lecture Award, which "recognizes a scholar’s sustained achievement in research, longstanding investment in the Smithsonian, and outstanding contribution to a field, as well as his or her ability to communicate research to a non-specialist audience."

Publications

Selected writing
 
 
 
 

 Poetry in Motion: Studies in Tongan Dance, 1993
 
 Polynesian and Micronesian sections of Oceanic Art, published in French, German, and English, 1993–1997
 From the Stone Age to the Space Age in 200 Years: Tongan Art and Society on the Eve of the Millennium, 1999
 
 The Pacific Arts of Polynesia and Micronesia, Oxford University Press, 2008

Editing
 Co-editor, Australia and the Pacific Islands, volume 9 of the Garland Encyclopedia of World Music, 1998

References

 Who's Who of American Women. Ninth edition, 1975–1976. Wilmette, IL

1935 births
2022 deaths
20th-century American non-fiction writers
20th-century American women writers
21st-century American non-fiction writers
21st-century American women writers
American anthropologists
American ethnologists
American ethnomusicologists
American women anthropologists
Dance historians
Smithsonian Institution people
Women ethnologists
Writers from Milwaukee
American women curators
American curators